Wankar Quta Qullu (Aymara wankara a kind of drum, quta lake, qullu mountain, "wankara lake mountain", also spelled Huancar Kkota Kkollu) is a mountain in the Andes of Bolivia, about  high. It is situated in the La Paz Department, Larecaja Province, Sorata Municipality, north of the main range of the Cordillera Real. Wankar Quta Qullu lies northeast of the mountain Wila Wilani. South of it there is a lake named Q'asiri Quta. A little river named Q'asiri Jawira originates here. It flows to Ch'uch'u Jawira in the south.

References 

Mountains of La Paz Department (Bolivia)